The Visean, Viséan or Visian is an age in the ICS geologic timescale or a stage in the stratigraphic column. It is the second stage of the Mississippian, the lower subsystem of the Carboniferous. It follows the Tournaisian age/stage and is followed by the Serpukhovian age/stage.

Name and definitions 
The Viséan Stage was introduced by Belgian geologist André Dumont in 1832. Dumont named this stage after the city of Visé in Belgium's Liège Province. Before being used as an international stage, the Visean Stage was part of the (West) European regional geologic time scale, in which it followed the Tournaisian Stage and is followed by the Namurian Stage. In the North American regional scale, the Visean Stage correlates with the upper Osagean, the Meramecian and lower Chesterian stages. In the Chinese regional time scale, it correlates with the lower and middle Tatangian series.

The base of the Viséan Stage is at the first appearance of the fusulinid species Eoparastaffella simplex (morphotype 1/morphotype 2). The type locality for the stage base used to be in a road section below the castle of Dinant in Belgium, but this type locality proved to be insufficient for the purpose of stratigraphic correlation. A GSSP has been proposed in the Luzhai Formation near Penchong in the Chinese province of Guanxi. The top (the base of the Serpukhovian and Namurian) is laid at the first appearance of the conodont Lochriea ziegleri, or at the base of the biozone of goniatite Cravenoceras leion.

Biota 
The Carboniferous-Earliest Permian Biodiversification Event began in the Viséan, coinciding with the start of the main phase of the Late Palaeozoic Ice Age.

The late Viséan saw the widespread reappearance of metazoan reefs after their devastation during the Hangenberg Event.

One of the tetrapods that lived during the Visean age was Westlothiana, a reptile-like amphibian. Though originally thought to be the earliest discovered amniote, more recent research has cast doubt on this interpretation.

Biostratigraphy 
The Visean contains four conodont biozones:
 Lochriea nodosa Zone
 Lochriea mononodosa Zone
 Gnathodus bilineatus Zone
 Gnathodus texanus Zone

In British stratigraphy, the Visean is subdivided into five substages. These are from bottom to top: Chadian (the lower part of this substage falls in the Tournaisian), Arundian, Holkerian, Asbian and Brigantian.

References

Further reading 
 ; 1832: Mémoire sur la constitution géologique de la province de Liège, Mémoires couronnés par l'Académie Royale des Sciences et Belles-Lettres de Bruxelles 8 (3), VII.

External links 
 Upper and lower time scales for the Carboniferous at the website of the Norwegian network of offshore records of geology and stratigraphy
 Visean, Geowhen Database
 The Viséan age, www.palaeos.com

 
Mississippian geochronology
Geological ages
.
Stratigraphy of Europe